Nazigo is a town in Kayunga District in the Central Region of Uganda.

Location
The town is on the main road between Kayunga in Kayunga District and Njeru in Buikwe District. The coordinates of Nazigo are 0°38'31.0"N, 32°59'24.0"E (Latitude:0.6419; Longitude:32.9900).

Overview
Nazigo is the site of the headquarters of Nazigo Sub-county, one of the four sub-counties in Ntenjeru County, a constituent of Kayunga District.

The town is also the home of the Nazigo Teacher Training College, administered by the Church of Uganda. Negotiations are underway, between the church and Muteesa I Royal University for the university to take over the college and transform it into its Faculty of Education, thus creating a campus in Nazigo.

Points of interest
The following additional points of interest lie within the town or close to its borders:

 offices of Nazigo Town Council
 Nazigo central market
 Nazigo police station
 Nazigo Health Centre III, a health unit administered by the Uganda Ministry of Health

See also
 Ntenjeru
 Bbaale

External links
 Muteesa I Royal University

References

Populated places in Uganda
Cities in the Great Rift Valley
Kayunga District